Sułów or Sulów may refer to the following places in Poland:
Sułów, Lesser Poland Voivodeship (south Poland)
Sułów, Lower Silesian Voivodeship (south-west Poland)
Sułów, Lubusz Voivodeship (west Poland)
Sułów, Lublin Voivodeship (east Poland)
Sulów, Lublin Voivodeship (east Poland)